Howell Prairie is an area west of Silverton, Oregon, United States, between the Little Pudding River and the Pudding River. It was named for John Howell, a pioneer of 1843. Howell Prairie post office was established in 1876 and closed in 1881. The Oregonian Railway Company also had a station named Howell Prairie, which was changed to Switzerland in 1892.

Settlements and locales on Howell Prairie include Geer, Durbin, Pratum, Central Howell, and North Howell.

See also
Waldo Hills

References

External links
History of Howell Prairie Cemetery from Oregonpioneers.com
Historic images of Howell Prairie from Salem Public Library

Grasslands of Oregon
Geography of Marion County, Oregon
Prairies